Our Lady of Tinos (Panagía Evangelístria tēs Tēnou,  "The All-Holy Bringer of Good News", and , Megalócharē tēs Tēnou,  "She of Great Grace") is the major Marian shrine in Greece. It is located in the town of Tinos on the island of Tinos.

The complex is built around a miraculous icon which according to tradition was found after the Virgin appeared to the nun Pelagia and revealed to her the place where the icon was buried. The icon is widely believed to be the source of numerous miracles.  It is by now almost completely encased in silver, gold, and jewels, and is commonly referred to as the "Megalócharē" ("[She of] Great Grace") or simply the "Chárē Tēs" ("Her Grace").  By extension the church is often called the same, and is considered a protectress of seafarers and healer of the infirm.

The icon was found on the very first days after the creation of the modern Greek State, henceforth Our Lady of Tinos was declared the patron saint of the Greek nation. The icon was at the time thought to be the handwork of St. Luke the Evangelist, and a nationwide fund collection was carried out for the building of a church to house it.

The church was designed by the architect from Tinos, Efstratios Emmanuel Kalonaris in the Renaissance style and was inaugurated in 1830. Since then it constitutes the major Christian pilgrimage in Greece, akin to Lourdes in France or Fatima in Portugal.  The church receives a vast number of donations in silver and gold votives each year; these are auctioned and used for charities.

The church is officially dedicated to the Annunciation of the Virgin Mary.  The major feast of the church, however, is on 15 August when the Dormition of the Virgin Mary (Theotokos) is commemorated by the Greek Orthodox Church, following the strong tradition of the Aegean Islands where the Dormition is grandly celebrated in mid-August as the principal summer feast.

The second finding of the icon took place on December 18th 1842, according to the Old Church Orthodox calendar in force until 1924 in Greece, corresponding to 31st December in the current civil calendar.

Further reading

 Jill Dubisch, In A Different Place: pilgrimage, gender and politics at a Greek island shrine. Princeton: Princeton University Press, 1995.

External links

Official webpage

Tinos
Eastern Orthodox church buildings in Greece
1830 establishments in Greece
Shrines to the Virgin Mary
Buildings and structures in the South Aegean
Tourist attractions in the South Aegean
Tinos
Renaissance Revival architecture in Greece